Ann Kristin Aafedt Flatland (born 6 November 1982) is a retired Norwegian biathlete. Ann Kristin Aafedt Flatland debuted in the World Cup in 2003 at Kontiolahti in Finland, where she came in 56th in the sprint event. In the second world cup weekend in Hochfilzen she debuted on the Norwegian relay team which finished 5th. She has two individual World Cup victories.
She represented Norway at the World Championship 2005 in Hochfilzen and came 22nd in the sprint and 37th in the pursuit.

Flatland retired from the sport at the end of the 2013–14 season.

Record

Individual victories

References

External links
 
 
 

1982 births
Living people
Norwegian female biathletes
Skiers from Oslo
Olympic biathletes of Norway
Biathletes at the 2010 Winter Olympics
Biathletes at the 2014 Winter Olympics
Biathlon World Championships medalists
Olympic bronze medalists for Norway
Olympic medalists in biathlon
Medalists at the 2014 Winter Olympics
21st-century Norwegian women